Mingus in Europe Volume I is a live album by the jazz bassist and composer Charles Mingus, recorded in 1964 in Stadthalle in Wuppertal, Germany and released on the Enja label in 1980.

Reception
The AllMusic review by Scott Yanow stated: "Although this music could be called avant-garde, there is nothing random about the notes picked or the many emotions expressed".

Track listing
All compositions by Charles Mingus except as indicated
 "Fables of Faubus" - 37:35
 "Starting" (Eric Dolphy, Charles Mingus) - 5:27 		
 "Meditations" 22:24 Bonus track on CD reissue

Personnel
Charles Mingus - bass
Eric Dolphy – alto saxophone, bass clarinet, flute
Clifford Jordan – tenor saxophone (tracks 1 & 3)
Jaki Byard – piano (tracks 1 & 3)
Dannie Richmond – drums (tracks 1 & 3)

References

Charles Mingus live albums
1980 live albums
Enja Records live albums